House Party was a professional wrestling supercard event produced by Extreme Championship Wrestling (ECW). It was held annually in January in from 1996 to 1999. The name of the event was a reference to the tag team The Public Enemy, who departed ECW after wrestling in the main event of the inaugural event.

Dates and venues

References

 
Recurring events established in 1996
Recurring events disestablished in 1999